is a Japanese visual artist. He lives and works in London and Tokyo.

Early life and education
Naoya Inose was born and raised in Kanagawa. In 2012 he graduated from Tokyo University of the Arts, where he specialised in oil painting. He lives and works in Tokyo and London. His works are included in the Takahashi Collection and in the Benetton Foundation.

Work
Inose's work explores the tension between the natural world and its grasping appropriation by human influence. Inose uses oil painting techniques to create both meticulously realistic landscapes and abstract oil paintings on canvas. His works of art create an inquiry of our relationship and understanding of nature. Inose also creates a debate on the role of the original masterpieces and how this has changes in the contemporary postmodern world. His home country Japan, which is constantly threatened by natural disasters, is a source of inspiration for his work: "Japan is well-known for its disasters, the country is in fact still recovering from the latest tsunami. Japanese people are always afraid of when the next disaster will strike. This may be the reason why the fantastical is such a popular theme in famous film productions like Godzilla, which is widely thought to be a metaphor for the war. This is the reason why I think art goes beyond the immortalisation of reality. Art exists to portray a much deeper meaning. This also explains why my own art is a mixture of reality and the fantastic as I use the latter to expose the problems I see around me."

Exhibitions

Japan
 2008 “THE SIX 2008”, Hillside Terrace, Tokyo
 2009 “4 Winds 2009”, Gallery Toki no wasuremono, Tokyo
 2009 “SLOGAN”, Ota Fine Arts, Tokyo
 2010 “G-tokyo2010” (art fair), Mori Arts Center Gallery, Tokyo
 2010 “Season of Incubation 2”, Ota Fine Arts, Tokyo
 2010 “Takamatsu Contemporary Art Annual vol.1”, Takamatsu City Museum of Art, Kagawa
 2011 “Melancholia”, Ota Fine Arts, Tokyo
 2012 “G-tokyo2012 - αExhibition” (art fair), Mori Arts Center Gallery, Tokyo
 2012 “Walk in Asia”, Ota Fine Arts, Tokyo
 2013 “Drawings”,Gallery SIDE2, Tokyo
 2015 “3331 Art Fair -Various Collectors”, 3331 Arts Chiyoda, Tokyo
 2016 “Crystal and landscape”, HARMAS GALLERY, Tokyo
 2016 "3331 Art Fair - Various Collectors Prizes", 3331 Arts Chiyoda, Tokyo

Europe 
 2013 “Imago Mundi”, Fondazione Querini Stampalia, Italy
 2015 “ARBITRARY DREAM”, Lacey Contemporary Gallery, London
 2015 “That's all they did tomorrow But you finished yesterday”, Pjazza Teatru Rjal Valletta, Malta
 2015 “Romancing Abstraction”, The Fitzrovia Gallery, London
 2016 “Contemporary Art Exhibition ‘On the Threshold II: Formal Presence’”, Oriental Museum, Durham University Durham The UK
 2017 "Entity of Truth", Lily Agius Gallery, Malta

United States 
 2016 Imago Mundi exhibition at the Pratt Institute, Brooklyn NYC

South Korea 
 2010 “KIAF 2010” COEX, Seoul
 2014 “Daegu Art fair 2014”, EXCO, Daegu

Hong Kong 
 2012 “ARTHK12”, Hong Kong Convention &Exhibition Centre (HKCEC) Hall1, Hong Kong

United Arab Emirates 
 2012 “Abu Dhabi Art2012”, Saadiyat Cultural District, Abu Dhabi

References

External links
Website Naoyainose.com/

1988 births
Living people
Artists from Kanagawa Prefecture
Tokyo University of the Arts alumni